Omer Danino (. Born on February 17, 1995) is an Israeli football player who plays for Hapoel Hadera in the Israeli Premier League.

Club career
Danino started his career at Maccabi Petah Tikva's youth team. On 17 May 2013 he made his debut at the senior team at the 1–1 draw against Maccabi Herzliya. Before 2014–15 season, Danino ended the youth age and became a senior player. At the beginning of the season, the defense of Petah Tikva had a lot of goals against, so the coach Ran Ben Shimon decided to give to Danino the opportunity and the ability of the defense has improved, Danino has become a player in the lineup. On 25 May 2015 he scored his debut career goal in the 1–0 victory against Maccabi Haifa.

On 4 August 2015 became the youngest captain in the club's history, After he received the captain when the club's captain Joachim Mununga substituted.

International career
Danino played at the Israel U-19 football team, he was part of the team first increase to 2014 UEFA European Under-19 Championship.

External links

References

1995 births
Living people
Israeli Jews
Footballers from Rosh HaAyin
Israeli footballers
Jewish Israeli sportspeople
Association football central defenders
Maccabi Petah Tikva F.C. players
Hapoel Kfar Saba F.C. players
Hapoel Hadera F.C. players
Liga Leumit players
Israeli Premier League players
Israeli people of Moroccan-Jewish descent
Israel under-21 international footballers